Lee Hoon (born May 6, 1973) is a South Korean actor.

Filmography

Television series

Film

Variety show

Music video

Radio program

Book

Awards and nominations

References

External links 
 Lee Hoon Fan Cafe at Daum 
 
 

1973 births
Living people
South Korean male television actors
South Korean male film actors
People from Seoul